PMLQ  may refer to:

 Pakistan Muslim League (Q)
 Parti marxiste-léniniste du Québec